The European X-Ray Free-Electron Laser Facility (European XFEL) is an X-ray research laser facility commissioned during 2017. The first laser pulses were produced in May 2017 and the facility started user operation in September 2017. The international project with twelve participating countries; nine shareholders at the time of commissioning (Denmark, France, Germany, Hungary, Poland, Russia, Slovakia, Sweden and Switzerland), later joined by three other partners (Italy,
Spain and the United Kingdom), is located in the German federal states of Hamburg and Schleswig-Holstein. A free-electron laser generates high-intensity electromagnetic radiation by accelerating electrons to relativistic speeds and directing them through special magnetic structures. The European XFEL is constructed such that the electrons produce X-ray light in synchronisation, resulting in high-intensity X-ray pulses with the properties of laser light and at intensities much brighter than those produced by conventional synchrotron light sources.

Location 

Accelerator 
The use of superconducting acceleration elements developed at DESY allows up to 27,000 repetitions per second, significantly more than other X-ray lasers in the U.S. and Japan can achieve. The electrons are then introduced into the magnetic fields of special arrays of magnets called undulators, where they follow curved trajectories resulting in the emission of X-rays whose wavelength is in the range of 0.05 to 4.7 nm.

Laser 
The X-rays are generated by self-amplified spontaneous emission (SASE), where electrons interact with the radiation that they or their neighbours emit.  Since it is not possible to build mirrors to reflect the X-rays for multiple passes through the electron beam gain medium, as with light lasers, the X-rays are generated in a single pass through the beam.  The result is spontaneous emission of X-ray photons which are coherent (in phase) like laser light, unlike X-rays emitted by ordinary sources like X-ray machines, which are incoherent. The peak brilliance of the European XFEL is billions of times higher than that of conventional X-ray light sources, while the average brilliance is 10,000 times higher. The higher electron energy allows the production of shorter wavelengths. The duration of the light pulses can be less than 100 femtoseconds.

Instruments 
There are six experiments conducted inside the XFEL by the scientists from all over the world. All of these experiments use the X-rays.

Femtosecond X-ray Experiments (FXE)

Single Particles, Clusters, and Biomolecules & Serial Femtosecond Crystallography (SPB/SFX)

Spectroscopy and Coherent Scattering (SCS)

Small Quantum Systems (SQS) 
The SQS instrument is developed to investigate fundamental processes of light-matter interaction in the soft X-ray wavelength radiation. Typical objects of investigation are in the range form isolated atoms to large bio-molecules, and typical methods are variety of spectroscopic techniques.
The SQS instrument provides three experimental stations:
 Atomic-like Quantum Systems (AQS) for atoms and small molecules
 Nano-size Quantum Systems (NQS) for clusters and nano-particles
 Reaction Microscope (SQS-REMI) enabling the complete characterization of the ionization and fragmentation process by analyzing all products created in the interaction of the target with the FEL pulses
Photon energy range between 260 eV and 3000 ev (4.8 nm to 0.4 nm). The ultrashort FEL pulses of less than 50 fs duration in combination with a synchronized optical laser allow for capturing ultrafast nuclear dynamics with unprecedented resolution.

High energy density matter (HED)

Materials imaging and Dynamics (MID) 
The scope of the MID instrument are material science experiments using the unprecedented coherent properties of the X-ray laser beams of the European XFEL. The scientific applications reach from condensed matter physics, studying for example glass formation and magnetism, to soft and biological material, such as colloids, cells and viruses.

Imaging
Imaging covers a broad range of techniques and scientific fields, from classical phase-contrast X-ray imaging to coherent X-ray diffraction imaging (CXDI) and with applications, e.g. in strain imaging inside nanostructured materials to bio-imaging of whole cells. In many cases the aim is to obtain a 3D representation of the investigated structure. By phase retrieval methods it is possible to pass from the measured diffraction patterns in reciprocal space to a real space visualization of the scattering object.

Dynamics
Complex nanoscale dynamics is an ubiquitous phenomenon of fundamental interest at the forefront of condensed matter science, and comprises a multitude of processes from visco-elastic flow or dissipation in liquids and glasses to polymer dynamics, protein folding, crystalline phase transitions, ultrafast spin transitions, domain wall dynamics, magnetic domain switching and many more. The extremely brilliant and highly coherent X-ray beams will open up unseen possibilities to study dynamics in disordered systems down to atomic length scales, with timescales ranging from femtoseconds to seconds using techniques such as XPCS.

Control 
The experiments in the facility are controlled via the in-house developed control system named Karabo. It is a distributed SCADA system written in C++ and python.

Research 
The short laser pulses make it possible to measure chemical reactions that are too rapid to be captured by other methods. The wavelength of the X-ray laser may be varied from 0.05 to 4.7 nm, enabling measurements at the atomic length scale.

Initially, one photon beamline with two experimental stations can be used. Later this will be upgraded to five photon beamlines and a total of ten experimental stations.

The experimental beamlines enable unique scientific experiments using the high intensity, coherence and time structure of the new source to be conducted in a variety of disciplines spanning physics, chemistry, materials science, biology and nanotechnology.

History 

The German Federal Ministry of Education and Research granted permission to build the facility on 5 June 2007 at a cost of €850 million, under the provision that it should be financed as a European project. The European XFEL GmbH that built and operates the facility was founded in 2009. Civil construction of the facility began on 8 January 2009. Construction of the tunnels was completed in summer 2012, and all underground construction was completed the following year. The first beams were accelerated in April 2017, and the first X-ray beams were produced in May 2017. XFEL was inaugurated in September 2017. The overall cost for the construction and commissioning of the facility is  estimated at €1.22 billion (price levels of 2005).

References

External links 

 European XFEL website
 Interactive Map
 The revolution of XFEL

Buildings and structures in Altona, Hamburg
Buildings and structures in Pinneberg (district)
Free-electron lasers
International research institutes
Physics in Germany
Research institutes in Germany
Research lasers
Science and technology in Europe
X-ray instrumentation